The Roman Catholic Diocese of Pescia is in Tuscany, about 41 miles (66 km) west of Florence. It is a suffragan of the Archdiocese of Pisa.

History

Provostship
As a favor to his Datary, Baldassare Turini, who was a cleric and notary of the diocese of Lucca, and Lorenzo de Cecchis, who was a Doctor in utroque iure and parish priest of the church of S. Maria Maggiore in Pescia, Pope Leo X, in the bull "Sacri Apostolatus" of 15 April 1519, withdrew Pescia from the archdiocese of Lucca, raising it to the dignity of a prelacy nullius, and made it directly dependent upon the Holy See (Papacy). The territory was to become a Provostship, and De Cecchis was named the first Provost. A corporation of Canons. or Chapter, was established, with several dignities: the Provost, the Archdeacon, the Archpriest, the Dean, and the Primicerius. The territory of the new prelacy was to include all the churches in the Val di Nievole and the Valle Ariana. The Provost was assigned both ecclesiastical and civil jurisdiction (both of civil cases and criminal cases) in the Provostship.

On 23 September 1519, Leo X issued a second bull, "Inter Caetera", in which he authorized the Bishop of Pistoia, the Bishop of Forlì, and the Abbot of Vallombrosa, to perform the canonical investiture of the new Provost, Lorenzo de Cecchis. He also fixed the number of Canons of the collegiate church at twelve, and specified that the dignities were to be the Provost, the Archdeacon, the Rector of the church of S. Stefano in Pescia (who would have the title Prior), the Rector of Ss. Matteo e Colombano in Pietrobono (with the title of Archpriest), the Dean, the Treasurer, and the Primicerius.

Pope Leo X also granted to the provosts the right to use the vestments proper to a bishop, including mitre, staff, and cross, within the confines of their provostship. This was confirmed by Pope Urban VIII in the bull "Dilecti filii" of 25 February 1635, to which the pope added the right to wear the cappa magna and the mozzetta, also within the confines of his jurisdiction.

A synod was held in the Provostship on 25–27 April 1694 by the Provost, Msgr. Benedetto Falconcini (1694-1704). The acts of the synod were published.

Diocese
In a bull of 17 March 1726, Pescia was established as a diocese by Pope Benedict XIII, and made suffragan of (subordinate to) Pisa. The first bishop was, as was customary, the last Provost of the Collegiate Chapter, Paolo Antonio Pesenti, who had been in office since 1707. He was named Bishop-elect on 17 March 1727, but he died on 1 August 1728, before he was consecrated a bishop.

Santa Maria Maggiore, dedicated to the taking up of the body of the Virgin Mary into heaven (Assumption), is referred to in documents as early as 991. The original church of the parish of Pescia, S. Maria Maggiore, which had been elevated to the status of a collegiate church, needed to be replaced. An enlarged church on the same site as the old church, and incorporating some of its elements, was constructed at the end of the 17th century, to designs by the Florentine architect, Antonio Ferri. The campanile is of the 14th century, though its uppermost part is of the late 18th century.

In 1742, the cathedral Chapter was composed of seven dignities and twelve Canons. The city of Pescia had about 5,000 inhabitants.

In 1784, with the cooperation of Grand Duke Leopold I, the diocesan seminary was opened.

By 1833, the population of the entire diocese of Pescia had risen to a total of 49,890 persons.

Bishops of Pescia

Bartolomeo Pucci Franceschi (1728–1737)
Francesco Gaetano Incontri (1738–1741)
Donato Maria Arcangeli (1742–1772)
Francesco Vincenti (1773–1803)
Giulio Rossi (1804–1833)
Giovanni Battista Rossi (1834–1837)
Vincenzo Menchi (1839–1843)
Pietro Niccolò Forti (1847–1854)
Giovanni Antonio Benini (Bedini) (1855–1896)
Giulio Matteoli (1896–1898)
Donato Velluti Zati di San Clemente (1898–1907 Resigned)
Giulio Serafini (1907)
Angelo Simonetti (1907–1950)
Dino Luigi Romoli, O.P. (1951–1977 Retired)
Giovanni Bianchi (1977–1993 Retired)
Giovanni De Vivo (1993–2015 Died)
Roberto Filippini (2015– )

Current Bishop

On 25 November 2015, Pope Francis appointed as the new bishop of the Diocese of Pescia, in Pescia, Italy, Roberto Filippini, S.T.L., a priest of the Roman Catholic Archdiocese of Pisa. Bishop Filippini was born in Vinci, Florence, Italy, on 6 June 1948. He studied for his undergraduate philosophy degree in the Archdiocesan Seminary of Pisa. He completed his graduate theological studies at the Almo Collegio Capranica, and attended the Pontifical Gregorian University as well as the Pontifical Biblical Institute, obtaining the Licentiate in Sacred Theology and in Sacred Scripture. He was ordained a priest on 14 April 1973, age 24, for the archdiocese of Pisa. He was Parochial Vicar (Associate Pastor) in the Parish of St. Hermes in Forte dei Marmi, Italy, from 1975 to 1978, and undertook teaching at the Seminary of Pisa. He was a Parish Priest in Calignola, Italy, from 1978 to 1984; from 1984 to 1997, Pastor of the Parish of Santo Sepolcro (Pisa) in Pisa; and from 1997, Parish Priest of San Martino, Italy. In 1996, he was appointed President of the Studio Teologico Interdiocesano di Camaiore (seminary) in Lucca, Italy. From 1999 to September 2015, Filippini was Rector of the Seminary "Santa Caterina" in Pisa. From 1999 to 2015, he served as a Prison Chaplain at a prison in Pisa. He has also been a Professor of Fundamental Theology and Sacred Scripture at the Higher Institute of Religious Sciences of Blessed Nicholas Steno, in Pisa, and at the School of Theological Education.

Notes and references

Books
 p. 762. (Use with caution; obsolete)

Studies

Pescia
Religious organizations established in the 1510s
Pescia
1519 establishments in the Holy Roman Empire